Julius Rodriguez, also known as "Orange Julius", is an American pianist, drummer and composer. In 2021, Rodriguez signed with Verve Records.

Biography

Early life

Rodriguez grew up in White Plains, New York and is of Haitian descent. He began to study classical piano at an early age. He was exposed to jazz, particularly music by Thelonious Monk, Duke Ellington, Louis Armstrong and John Coltrane through his father, an avid jazz fan and aficionado. At age twelve, he enrolled in Manhattan School of Music's precollege division and studied there continuously throughout high school. He later studied at The Juilliard School.

Musical career

Rodriguez’s music integrates elements from jazz, avant-garde, R&B, hip-hop and pop music.  He has drawn inspiration from The Bad Plus, Vijay Iyer and Jason Moran to find novel ways of integrating music outside of the jazz canon, including music by The Beatles.

Rodriguez has been an active touring member of Isaiah Barr's Onyx Collective, a group which has done collaborative work with a wide range of artists, including Dave Glasser, Ratking, and members of the Wu Tang Clan. The group accompanied A$AP Rocky on a 2018 tour in which Rodriguez performed on both keyboard and guitar.

He has worked as a sideman with Keyon Harrold, Ben Williams, Carmen Lundy, James Morrison, Jazzmeia Horn, Dev Hynes, Roy Hargrove, Macy Gray, Wynton Marsalis, Veronica Swift, Gabriel Garzón-Montano, Nick Hakim, Meshell Ndegeocello and others.

Rodriguez also performs regularly as a drummer.

Discography

As leader

As sideman

References

External links 

Living people
American jazz pianists
American jazz drummers
American jazz composers
Juilliard School alumni
21st-century American pianists
21st-century American male musicians
1998 births